Willor Lee Guilford (born January 13, 1912) was an African American actress. She had substantial parts in several films including at least three Oscar Micheaux films.

Career

She portrayed the victim of a stalker in Ten Minutes to Live. In the film, she receives a note from the villain telling her she will be killed in 10 minutes.

Later life

Guilford opened a millinery shop in Brooklyn, New York ("Willor's Hat Shop") after retiring from her film career. She eventually retired to Jacksonville, Florida.

Filmography
Easy Street (1930)
A Daughter of the Congo (1930)
Ten Minutes to Live (1932) as Letha Watkins
Veiled Aristocrats (1932)

References

External links
"Preview Clip: Ten Minutes to Live" featuring Willor Lee Guilford

20th-century American actresses
American milliners
Businesspeople from Brooklyn
Actresses from Florida
Actresses from New York City
1912 births
Year of death missing